Beth Tzedec Congregation is a Conservative synagogue on Bathurst Street in Toronto, Ontario, Canada. It was founded in 1955 with the amalgamation of the Goel Tzedec and Beth Hamidrash Hagadol Chevra Tehillim congregations, established respectively in 1883 and 1887. The synagogue has some 2,200 member units, representing over 4,000 members.

History

Early years

The Goel Tzedec ('Righteous Redeemer') congregation was founded in October 1883 by (primarily Litvak) Eastern European Jewish immigrants to Toronto, as an Orthodox alternative to the Reform Holy Blossom Temple. The synagogue purchased the building of a former church at University Avenue and Elm Street the following year. Meanwhile, some of its members (mainly Russians and Galitzianers) left in 1887 to establish a new synagogue, Chevra Tehillim ('The Congregation of Psalms').

In 1905, Goel Tzedec appointed as spiritual leader the Volozhin Yeshiva graduate Rabbi Jacob Gordon, who would serve as senior rabbi until his death in November 1934. That same year, a building site on University Avenue near Armoury was purchased, and the new building was dedicated in February 1907. With seating for 1,200, the synagogue, designed by architect , was the largest in the city. In 1905, Chevra Tehillim purchased the New Richmond Methodist Church on McCaul Street, designed by architects Smith & Gemmel, and was renamed Beth Hamidrash Hagadol Chevra Tehillim ('The Great House of Prayer of the Congregation of Psalms'; informally the 'McCaul Street Synagogue').

Goel Tzedec adopted English-language sermons in 1913, while Chevra Tehillim did so only in the 1920s (and only on High Holy Days). The former joined the Conservative movement in 1925, though it retained most of its traditional practices. Among other changes, insistence on decorum during the service, the seating of women on the main floor, a new prayer book, and the addition of some English prayers were introduced at Goel Tzedec in the mid-1930s.

As Toronto Jewry began moving further north, Goel Tzedec in 1946 purchased the synagogue's current site on Bathurst in York Township. In 1949, it established with the McCall Street Synagogue what would become the Beth Tzedec Memorial Park. The congregation held Canada's first bat mitzvah ceremony in 1950.

Amalgamation to present
Goel Tzedec and Beth Hamidrash Hagadol amalgamated in 1952 to form the Beth Tzedec Congregation, and in December 1955 dedicated their new building, designed by architect Peter Dickinson of the consulting firm Page and Steele.

Judy Feld Carr became Beth Tzedec's first female president in 1983. The synagogue began granting aliyahs to women in the mid-1990s, and counting women in minyanim shortly thereafter.

Beth Tzedec briefly withdrew from the United Synagogue of Conservative Judaism in 2008, but rejoined in 2014.

See also
 Beth Tzedec Memorial Park
 History of the Jews in Toronto

References

External links
 

1883 establishments in Ontario
1887 establishments in Ontario
1955 establishments in Ontario
Ashkenazi Jewish culture in Toronto
Conservative synagogues in Canada
Synagogues in Toronto
Peter Dickinson (architect) buildings